Scottsburg may refer to:
Scottsburg, former name of Centerville, Fresno County, California
 Scottsburg, Indiana
 Scottsburg, Pike County, Indiana
 Scottsburg, Virginia